Andrzej Osipów (born 31 March 1953 in Osieczna, Pomeranian Voivodeship) was a CEO of Szybka Kolej Miejska. He has held this position since June 2006 until June 2009.

Mr. Osipów graduated in law and administration at Uniwersytet im. Mikołaja Kopernika in Toruń (Copernicus University). He was connected with Polish railways since 1968, when he had started to work for Zakłady Naprawcze Taboru kolejowego (Repair Works of Rolling Stock). In the period from 1991–1998, he was the CEO of Przedsiębiortwo Robót Komunikacyjnych in Gdańsk (Gdańsk Rail Works Co), after which he took the position of Port Morski in Gdynia (Gdynia Maritime Port) supervisory board's secretary.

References

1953 births
Living people
People from Starogard County
Polish State Railways people